Ottó Prouza (13 June 1933 – 15 October 2021) was a Hungarian volleyball player. He competed in the men's tournament at the 1964 Summer Olympics.

References

External links
 

1933 births
2021 deaths
Hungarian men's volleyball players
Olympic volleyball players of Hungary
Volleyball players at the 1964 Summer Olympics
People from Salgótarján
Sportspeople from Nógrád County